Jiyon Kathi is an Indian Bengali television soap opera that premiered on 23 September 2019, and aired on Bengali General Entertainment Channel Sun Bangla. It is the first show produced by Organinc Studios (of Arka Ganguly), a subsidiary of Magic Moments Motion Pictures (of Saibal Banerjee and Leena Gangopadhyay), and stars Aindrila Sharma and Joy Mukherjee, later replaced by Somraj Maity.

Premise
A simple girl's fate brings her closer to an angry yet influential man. Her grounded dreams are met with his sky-high ambitions eventually brewing love between them.

Cast

Main
 Aindrila Sharma as Jahnabi Chatterjee aka Tuli - An IAS Officer, Roshni's younger half-sister, Rishi's second wife (once divorced, twice married), Dipto's wife (marriage annulled), Oli's adoptive elder paternal sister, Abhimanyu's step/adoptive mother.
 Joy Mukherjee / Somraj Maity as Rishi Sen - An IAS Officer, Jahnabi's second husband (once divorced, twice married), Roshni's husband (divorced), Oli's husband (marriage ended with her death), Abhimanyu's father.

Recurring
 Rishi's family
 Manishankar Banerjee as Abhik Sen - Rishi's elder paternal uncle, Hemangini's estranged husband, Harsho's father.
 Rajashree Bhowmik as Hemangini Sen - Rishi's elder aunt, Abhik's estranged wife, Harsho's mother. 
 Rahul Chakraborty as Pratik Sen - Rishi and Tilottoma's father.  
 Tramila Bhattacharya / Anindita Saha as Kalpana Sen - Rishi and Tilottoma's mother.
 Debottam Majumdar as Harsho Bardhan Sen aka Harsho - Rishi's elder cousin brother, Lekha's husband.
 Debolina Mukherjee as Srilekha Sen aka Lekha - Harsho's wife, Rishi's elder sister-in-law.
 Soumi Banerjee as Tilottoma Sen - Rishi's younger sister.
 Abhirup Sen as Abhimanyu Sen aka Babi - Rishi and Oli's son, Jahnabi's step/adoptive son.

 Others
 Mishmee Das as Roshni Chatterjee - Jahnabi's elder half-sister, Rishi's first wife (divorced), Sanjeet's wife (till she murdered him), a girl and child trafficker.
 Bharat Kaul as Kushal Chatterjee - Anjana's husband and Roshni's father, Rai's estranged husband and Jahnabi's estranged father.
 Jayashree Mukherjee as Anjana Chatterjee - Kushal's first (legal) wife, Roshni's mother.
 Rhimjhim Gupta as Rai Chatterjee (née Bose) - Kushal's second (unofficial) wife, Jahnabi's mother.
 Shaktipada Dey as Raghav Bose - Rai's elder brother, Jahnabi's maternal uncle.
 Sukriti Lahori as Jahnabi's college principal.
 Sujoy Saha as Diptojit - Kushal's former employee, Jahnabi's first husband (marriage annulled).
 Anashuya Majumdar as the head of a group of courtesans, Jahnabi's dance teacher.
 Sonal Mishra as a courtesan
 Diganta Bagchi as a lawyer
 Nishantika Das as Oli Bose - Rishi's third wife, Jahnabi's adoptive younger maternal sister, Abhimanyu's mother. (Deceased)
 Sandip Chakroborty as Amitabho Bose - Oli's father, Jahnabi's saviour and adoptive maternal uncle.
 Sanjukta Roy Chowdhury as Rupasree Bose - Oli's mother, Jahnabi's adoptive aunt.

References

2019 Indian television series debuts
Sun Bangla original programming